Becoming Mona is a 2021 Belgian-Dutch drama film based on the bestselling novel by Griet Op De Beeck. The film premiered at the Seattle Film Festival where it won the Critics Prize. It also won the Grand Prix at the Molodist International Film Festival in Kyiv. It also played at the Chicago International Film Festival and at the Film Fest Gent In January 2021 it won an Ensor Award for best co-production.

References

External links 
 

2020 films
Dutch drama films
Belgian drama films
2020s Dutch-language films
2020 drama films
Dutch-language Belgian films